Fangxun Li (Fang-Hsuin Lee) (1902-1962) was a Chinese chemist, specializing in physical chemistry. He worked as a researcher, teacher, and administrator, and was the first vice president of Nanjing University after its merger with the University of Nanking in 1952. He was one of the founding members of the Chinese Academy of Sciences, which was created in 1955.

Li got his bachelor's degree in 1925 from the University of Nanking. He then traveled to the United States and obtained his PhD in 1934 at Northwestern University. He studied the influence of dipolar ions on the solubility of salts, molar polarization and radius-ratio of ions.

Having returned to the University of Nanking in 1934, he invited Choh Hao Li, who had recently obtained his Bachelor degree, to collaborate on a project; this led to a paper in the Journal of the American Chemical Society, and inspired Choh Hao Li to pursue graduate studies in the United States.

He was given an honorary Degree (Doctor of Science) in 1948 by Northwestern University. The citation is: 

His work was included in "Science Outpost", edited by Joseph Needham.

Awards, honors and fellowships
 1947 – Member of the council of the Chinese Chemical Society
 1948 – honorary doctorate, Northwestern University
 1952 – Vice president, Nanjing University
 1955 – Member, Chinese Academy of Sciences
 1957 – Member, Member of the Scientific Planning Committee of the State Council
 1959 – Member of the National Committee of the Chinese People's Political Consultative Conference

References 

University of Nanking alumni
Chinese physical chemists
1902 births
1962 deaths
Northwestern University alumni
Chinese expatriates in the United States
Academic staff of Nanjing University
20th-century chemists
Scientists from Jiangsu
20th-century Chinese scientists
Members of the Chinese Academy of Sciences